Lasiospermum (cocoonhead) is a genus of flowering plants in the daisy family.

 Species
 Lasiospermum bipinnatum (Thunb.) Druce - Lesotho; introduced in Australia, California
 Lasiospermum brachyglossum DC. - Saudi Arabia, Sinai, Palestine
 Lasiospermum pedunculare Lag. - South Africa
 Lasiospermum poterioides Hutch. - South Africa

 Species in homonymic genus
Species included in Lasiospermum Fisch. 1812, now assigned to Lasiospora and Scorzonera
 Lasiospermum angustifolium Fisch. - Scorzonera biebersteinii Lipsch.
 Lasiospermum ensifolium (M.Bieb.) Fisch. - Scorzonera ensifolia M.Bieb.
 Lasiospermum hirtum Fisch. - Lasiospora hirsuta (Gouan) Cass.

References

Anthemideae
Asteraceae genera
Taxa named by Friedrich Ernst Ludwig von Fischer
Taxa named by Mariano Lagasca